The English Turn Golf and Country Club is a private golf course and country club in the southern United States, located in  New Orleans, Louisiana. Formerly a venue of the PGA Tour, its par-72 championship course measures  from the  It is the home course for the Tulane Green Wave and the University of New Orleans Privateers college golf teams.

Course history
Southeast of downtown, the course was designed by Jack Nicklaus for the New Orleans PGA Tour event and opened  The event, previously held at Lakewood Country Club, was played at English Turn for sixteen editions (1989–2004), then moved west to TPC Louisiana in 2005. Damage to that course by Hurricane Katrina in late summer caused a one-year return 

Tournaments

PGA Tour
The tour event at English Turn went by many names:
USF&G Classic (1989–1991)
Freeport-McMoRan Golf Classic (1992–1993)
Freeport-McMoRan Classic (1994–1995)
Freeport-McDermott Classic (1996–1998)
Compaq Classic of New Orleans (1999–2002)
HP Classic of New Orleans (2003–2004) 
Zurich Classic of New Orleans (2006)

American Junior Golf Association
American Junior Golf Association's New Orleans event (1989–2003)

College
Sugar Bowl Intercollegiate Golf Championship (2010–present)(Tulane Green Wave golf annual home meet)

Club facilities
The venue offers chipping and putting practice areas. The facility also has six tennis courts and a junior Olympic-size pool used as the home of a swim team.

See also
Zurich Classic of New Orleans
Tulane Green Wave

References

External links

College golf clubs and courses in the United States
Golf clubs and courses in New Orleans
Swimming venues in New Orleans
Tennis venues in New Orleans
Tulane Green Wave sports venues
Sports venues completed in 1988
1988 establishments in Louisiana